is a railway station on the Hokuriku Railroad Ishikawa Line in the city of Kanazawa, Ishikawa Prefecture, Japan, operated by the private railway operator Hokuriku Railroad (Hokutetsu).

Lines

Station layout
The station consists of one side platform serving a single bi-directional track. The station is unattended.

Adjacent stations

History
Otomaru Station opened on 2 March 1935.

Surrounding area
 Nuka Junior High School
 Nuka Elementary School

See also
 List of railway stations in Japan

References

External links

  

Railway stations in Ishikawa Prefecture
Railway stations in Japan opened in 1935
Hokuriku Railroad Ishikawa Line